Irene Catherine Pirie-Milton (June 7, 1914 – December 1998), née Irene Catherine Pirie, was a Canadian champion swimmer who competed internationally in freestyle events.

At the 1930 British Empire Games in Hamilton, Ontario, she was a member of the Canadian team which won the silver medal in the 4×100-yard freestyle relay event.  At the 1934 British Empire Games in London, she won a gold medal with the Canadian team in the 4×100-yard relay competition.  She also won a silver medal in the 100-yard freestyle and a bronze medal in the 440 yard freestyle.

At the 1932 Summer Olympics in Los Angeles, she was a member of the Canadian team which finished fourth in the women's 4×100-metre freestyle relay.  She also participated in the 100-metre freestyle and 400-metre freestyle, but in both she was eliminated in the first round.  Four years later at the 1936 Summer Olympics in Berlin, Germany, she was on the Canadian team that finished fourth in the 4×100 metre freestyle relay.  Individually, she competed in the first round of the 100-metre freestyle event, but did not advance.

Pirie was a sister of Canadian swimmer Bob Pirie, the wife of British swimmer and water polo player Frederick Milton, and the mother of British swimmer Hamilton Milton.  She was inducted into the Canadian Olympic Hall of Fame in 1975.  In Ontario, the Irene Pirie Trophy is awarded by Swim Ontario to the female swimmer of the year selected by the Ontario Swimming Coaches Association; the male swimmer of the year is awarded the Bob Pirie Trophy.

References 

1914 births
1998 deaths
Canadian female freestyle swimmers
Commonwealth Games bronze medallists for Canada
Commonwealth Games gold medallists for Canada
Commonwealth Games silver medallists for Canada
Olympic swimmers of Canada
Swimmers from Toronto
Swimmers at the 1932 Summer Olympics
Swimmers at the 1930 British Empire Games
Swimmers at the 1936 Summer Olympics
Swimmers at the 1934 British Empire Games
Commonwealth Games medallists in swimming
Medallists at the 1930 British Empire Games
Medallists at the 1934 British Empire Games